Peter Allen Westgarth  was the chief executive, The Duke of Edinburgh's Award (DofE) and former chief executive of Young Enterprise UK, Oxford. In 2006, he was awarded the Queen's Award for Enterprise Promotion.

Westgarth joined The Duke of Edinburgh's Award in 2005 and oversaw a complete rebrand, leaving in 2019. He was appointed Commander of the Royal Victorian Order (CVO) in the 2020 New Year Honours.

References

Queen's Award for Enterprise Promotion (2006)
British businesspeople
Living people
Year of birth missing (living people)
Commanders of the Royal Victorian Order